Joseph Keter (born June 13, 1969) is a former Kenyan athlete, winner of 3000 m steeplechase at the 1996 Summer Olympics.

Born in Lessos, Nandi District, Joseph Keter, an officer of Kenyan Army, had only one good season throughout his athletics career, which culminated with an Olympic gold medal.

Career
In Atlanta, the hot favourite to 3000 m steeplechase gold medal was a world record holder Moses Kiptanui. But in the Olympic final, Kiptanui was strongly challenged by his Armed Forces' colleague Keter. The Kenyan pair reached the final water jump side by side, but then Keter slowly edged ahead to win the gold medal by 1.11 seconds.

After the Olympic Games, Keter beat Kiptanui again in Zürich, running his personal best 8.05.99. After that glorious season, Keter kept running for some seasons and won the IAAF Grand Prix in 3000 m steeplechase in 1997.

External links

1969 births
Living people
Kenyan male steeplechase runners
Kenyan male middle-distance runners
Olympic athletes of Kenya
Athletes (track and field) at the 1996 Summer Olympics
Olympic gold medalists for Kenya
People from Nandi County
Medalists at the 1996 Summer Olympics
Olympic gold medalists in athletics (track and field)
Goodwill Games medalists in athletics
Competitors at the 1994 Goodwill Games